Haydn: The Six Last Sonatas is Glenn Gould's only album dedicated solely to the composer Joseph Haydn, although in 1958 he had released an album consisting of music by both Haydn and his contemporary, Wolfgang Amadeus Mozart. In 1983, a year after Gould's death, the album was nominated for Best Classical Album at the Juno Awards of 1983 but lost to Gould's own recording, Bach: The Goldberg Variations.

See also 
 Glenn Gould discography

References

External links 
 

Glenn Gould albums
Classical albums
1982 albums
 
Columbia Records albums